North of Boston is a collection of seventeen poems by Robert Frost, first published in 1914 by David Nutt in Great Britain. Most of the poems resemble short dramas or dialogues. It is also called a book of people because most of the poems deal with New England themes and Yankee farmers. Ezra Pound wrote a review of this collection in 1914. Despite it being called "North of Boston", none of the poems have that name.

Background

Following its success, Henry Holt and Company republished Frost's first book in the United States, A Boy's Will, in 1915. The New York Times said in a review, "In republishing his first book after his second, Mr. Robert Frost has undertaken the difficult task of competing with himself."

List of poems
 "The Pasture" (introductory poem)
 "Mending Wall"
 "The Death of the Hired Man"
 "The Mountain"
 "A Hundred Collars"
 "Home Burial"
 "The Black Cottage"
 "Blueberries"
 "A Servant to Servants"
 "After Apple-Picking"
 "The Code"
 "The Generations of Men"
 "The Housekeeper"
 "The Fear"
 "The Self-seeker"
 "The Wood-pile"
 "Good Hours"

References

External links

 
 
 Full text at Project Gutenberg
 

1914 poetry books
American poetry collections
Massachusetts culture
Poetry by Robert Frost
Works by Robert Frost